Claude Mithon de Senneville de Genouilly (Saint-Domingue  — ) was a French Navy officer. He served in the War of American Independence.

Biography 
Mithon de Genouilly was born in the family of the Intendant of Toulon. He joined the Navy as a Garde-Marine on 14 December 1743.  He was promoted to Lieutenant on 15 May 1756. 

He was promoted to Captain on 18 February 1772.

Genouilly captained the 60-gun Saint Michel at the Battle of Ushant on 27 July 1778.

In 1779, Mithon de Genouilly commanded the 70-gun Dauphin Royal, part of a division under De Grasse sent to reinforce the French squadron off America under Estaing.

In 1782, he commanded the 74-gun Magnifique, before transferring to Couronne. On Couronne, he took part in the Battle of the Saintes on 12 April 1782. 

He was promoted to Chef d'Escadre on 20 August 1784.

Sources and references 
 Notes

Citations

References
 
 

External links
 

French Navy officers
French military personnel of the American Revolutionary War